The plumed whistling duck (Dendrocygna eytoni), also called the grass whistling duck, is a whistling duck that breeds in Australia. It is a predominantly brown-coloured duck with a long neck and characteristic plumes arising from its flanks. The sexes are similar in appearance.

Taxonomy 
Described by English naturalist Thomas Campbell Eyton in 1838, its specific epithet honours its namer. Its generic name is derived from the Ancient Greek terms dendron "tree", and kuknos (via Latin cygnus) "swan". Alternate common names include; Eyton's plumed, red-legged or whistling tree-duck, and grey or red-legged whistler.

Description 
The chest is chestnut with thin black bars, while long black-margined plumes arise from its flanks. Its bill and legs are pink, and its iris is yellow. The male and female are similar in appearance. The species has a characteristic lowered neck and short, dark, rounded wings while flying.

The call is a characteristic whistle which gives the bird its common name.

Distribution and habitat 
The range is eastern, northern and central Australia from the Kimberley across the Top End and Cape York, down to southern Queensland and northern New South Wales on the east coast, although may reach north-western Victoria inland, in the vicinity of the Murray River. It is also found in New Guinea. The preferred habitat is tall grassland and savanna, often near bodies of water.

Feeding 
Rather than diving for food in bodies of water like other ducks, the plumed whistling duck feeds by cropping grass on land.

Breeding 
The plumed whistling duck breeds during the wet season, generally in January to March, although it can be later in April or, in a few cases, May. One brood is raised per season. The nest is a mattress of grasses or similar material in tall grass, or in or near vegetation as cover. Initially shiny and creamy-coloured, they may become stained. The incubation period is around 30 days.

References

External links 

 BirdLife Species Factsheet

Articles containing video clips
plumed whistling duck
Birds of Australia
plumed whistling duck
plumed whistling duck